The Wuying Pagoda, also known as the Xingfu Temple Pagoda and The Thousand Year-Old Pagoda of Wuhan, is a Buddhist pagoda in Wuchang, Wuhan, Hubei Province, China.  Built of stone 750 years ago during the final years of the Southern Song Dynasty, it is the oldest standing architectural feature in Wuhan. Wuying Pagoda is a Major Historical and Cultural Site Protected at the National Level.

History

Original Pagoda
The origin of Wuying Pagoda stretches back to the later part of the Northern and Southern dynasties period, it having been built during the reign of Emperor Yuan of Liang as part of the Jin'an Temple. Subsequently, during the reign of Emperor Wen of Sui, the temple was renamed Xingfu Temple. The pagoda then derived its name from its connection to this temple.

Repeated destruction and rebuilding
The original pagoda having been destroyed at some earlier time, it was rebuilt in 1270 in the throes of the overthrow of the Southern Song during the reign of Emperor Duzong. The pagoda bears inscriptions dating from the period. The pagoda was designed to incorporate Buddhist iconography through various symbolic features and figures including images of Buddha, bodhisattvas, heavenly kings and celestial guards.  While of solid stone construction, it is modeled upon multi-storeyed wooden pagodas. Some of the original artistry has been damaged.

Xingfu Temple was left in ruins in the 19th century, victim of the Taiping Rebellion.  In 1953, Wuying Pagoda was located in a courtyard next to a kitchen in a residential area to the east of Mount Hong within the grounds of South Central University for Nationalities, and was tilting severely. On November 15, 1956, the pagoda was among the first 101 locations in Hubei province declared a Major Historical and Cultural Site Protected at the Provincial Level. In the winter of 1962/1963, it was moved to its current site at the western foot of Mount Hong adjoining a new tomb for Shi Yang that was erected in Hongshan Park by  the local Ministry of Culture.

Current status
The pagoda has eight sides and seven storeys, with four of the storeys including carvings of Buddhist figures carved in small niches. It is 11.25 meters tall, with a diameter of 4.25 meters at the "Sumeru Throne" ( xūmízuò) style base.

On December 18, 2001, the Cultural Department of Wuchang completed repairs to the pagoda. In the seventh listing of major historical sites in China published on March 5, 2013, the pagoda was listed as a Major Historical and Cultural Site Protected at the National Level from the Song Dynasty, with historical site number 7-1213-3-511.

Legend

Dragon Vein
According to one tradition, there is a 'dragon vein' under the mountains in this area, including Mount She (Snake Mountain).  The head of the dragon is said to be beneath the Yellow Crane Tower and the area beneath Wuying Pagoda the tail of the dragon. The pagoda was built to block the dragon vein. According to another, related in the Annals of Huguang Province, it was built on a vein of water which was connected to the Yangtze River.

'Shadowless'
There are multiple and varied claims made about the pagoda's lack of a shadow. The claim is made that the pagoda casts no shadow at noon on the summer solstice, or at noon on the winter solstice. More sensationally, the claim is made that the pagoda never casts a shadow. An explanation given for the modern appearance of a shadow is the change in the pagoda's location. The name is often used as the focus of puns and other jokes.

Gallery

See also

Chinese pagoda
Chinese architecture
Architecture of the Song Dynasty
Seokgatap, ancient South Korean pagoda also referred to as the 'Shadowless Pagoda'

References

External links
Hong Hill, Wuhan
听张良皋教授讲述武汉最老古建筑——无影塔的前世今身 
变化时间空间 “无影塔”成了有影塔 
武昌洪山无影塔游记 

Buddhist temples in Hubei
Buildings and structures completed in the 13th century
Religious buildings and structures in Wuhan
Architecture in China
Pagodas in China
History of Hubei
Major National Historical and Cultural Sites in Hubei
Military history of the Song dynasty
Octagonal buildings in China
Rebuilt buildings and structures in China
Religion in Hubei
Song dynasty architecture